Sir Ralph Lopes, 2nd Baronet (10 September 1788 – 23 January 1854), of Maristow in the parish of Tamerton Foliot, Devon, was a British Member of Parliament (MP).

Lopes was born as Ralph Franco. His uncle, Manasseh Masseh Lopes, an MP and borough owner, was created a baronet in 1805, with a special remainder to his nephew. Ralph entered Parliament in 1814 as member for Westbury, a pocket borough controlled by his uncle, for which he initially sat until 1819. On his uncle's death in 1831 he inherited both the baronetcy and his estate, a condition of which was that he change his surname to Lopes. Included in the estate was the right to nominate the MPs at Westbury (though this did not survive the Great Reform Act of the following year), and he resumed his seat for the borough. Although he had originally sat as a Tory like his uncle, he now expressed his support for the Reform Bill and sat with the Whigs.

Having been three times elected unopposed, Ralph switched his loyalties during the 1835 Parliament from the Whigs back to the Conservatives, and at the 1837 election a Whig candidate stood against him and defeated him, by the narrow margin of 98 votes to 96. However, at the next election, in 1841, Lopes was once again elected unopposed, this time as a Conservative. In 1847 he stood down in Westbury, not contesting the election, but two years later he returned to the Commons at a by-election for the Southern Devon county division. He held this seat until his death in 1854.

His older son, Sir Massey Lopes, succeeded him as baronet; a younger son, Henry Lopes, 1st Baron Ludlow, served in Parliament and later as a Lord Justice of Appeal before being granted a peerage in 1897.

Arms

Lopes adopted the coat of arms granted to his uncle Manasseh Lopes, blazoned Azure, a chevron or charged with three bars gemelles gules between three eagles rising of the second on a chief of the second five lozenges of the first.

References

Michael Brock, The Great Reform Act (London: Hutchinson, 1973)
F W S Craig, British Parliamentary Election Results 1832-1885 (2nd edition, Aldershot: Parliamentary Research Services, 1989)
 Victoria County History of the County of Wiltshire

External links 
 

|-

1788 births
1854 deaths
Lopes, Ralph, 2nd Baronet
UK MPs 1812–1818
UK MPs 1818–1820
UK MPs 1831–1832
UK MPs 1832–1835
UK MPs 1835–1837
UK MPs 1841–1847
UK MPs 1847–1852
UK MPs 1852–1857
Conservative Party (UK) MPs for English constituencies
Tory MPs (pre-1834)
English people of Portuguese-Jewish descent
People from Plymouth (district)
Ralph
Jewish British politicians
Members of the Parliament of the United Kingdom for South Devon

Jamaican people of Portuguese descent
English people of Portuguese descent